Amanita canescens is a species of Amanita found from Connecticut to Alabama, United States.

References

External links

canescens
Fungi of North America